The DH postcode area, also known as the Durham postcode area, is a group of eight postcode districts in north-east England, which are subdivisions of five post towns. These districts cover northern County Durham (including Durham, Chester-le-Street, Consett and Stanley) and south-west Tyne and Wear (including Houghton-le-Spring), plus a very small part of Northumberland.



Coverage
The approximate coverage of the postcode districts:

|-
! DH1
| DURHAM
| Durham
| County Durham
|-
! DH2
| CHESTER LE STREET
| Chester-Le-Street (west of East Coast Main Line), Ouston, Pelton, Birtley (west of East Coast Main Line)
| County Durham, Gateshead
|-
! DH3
| CHESTER LE STREET
| Chester-le-Street (east of East Coast Main Line), Great Lumley, Birtley (east of East Coast Main Line)
| County Durham, Gateshead
|-
! DH4
| HOUGHTON LE SPRING
| Houghton-le-Spring (West of A690), Penshaw, Shiney Row
| County Durham, Sunderland
|-
! DH5
| HOUGHTON LE SPRING
| Houghton-le-Spring (East of A690), Hetton-le-Hole
| Sunderland
|-
!DH6
| DURHAM
| South Hetton, Haswell, Shotton Colliery, Ludworth, Shadforth, Sherburn, Littletown, Kelloe, Coxhoe , Bowburn, Cassop, Pittington, Thornley, Wheatly Hill
| County Durham
|-
! DH7
| DURHAM
| Brandon, Lanchester, Esh Winning, Burnhope, Langley Park, Sacriston, Ushaw Moor, Brancepeth
| County Durham
|-
!rowspan=3|DH8
| CONSETT
| Consett, Blackhill, Bridgehill, Shotley Bridge, Leadgate, Delves Lane
|rowspan=3|County Durham, Northumberland
|-
| DURHAM
|
|-
| STANLEY
|
|-
! DH9
| STANLEY
| Dipton, Stanley, Annfield Plain
| County Durham
|-
! style="background:#FFFFFF;"|DH97
| style="background:#FFFFFF;"|DURHAM
| style="background:#FFFFFF;"|HM Passport Office
| non-geographic
|-
! style="background:#FFFFFF;"|DH98
| style="background:#FFFFFF;"|DURHAM
| style="background:#FFFFFF;"|BT
| style="background:#FFFFFF;"|non-geographic
|-
! style="background:#FFFFFF;"|DH99
| style="background:#FFFFFF;"|DURHAM
| style="background:#FFFFFF;"|National Savings and Investments
| style="background:#FFFFFF;"|non-geographic
|}

Map

See also
List of postcode areas in the United Kingdom
Postcode Address File

References

External links
Royal Mail's Postcode Address File
A quick introduction to Royal Mail's Postcode Address File (PAF)

Durham, England
Postcode areas covering North East England